Doddle is a mobile phone app.

Doddle may also refer to:
 Doddle Parcels, a UK logistics company
 A British slang term meaning something simple or easy to accomplish

See also
 Doodle (disambiguation)